A soil scientist is a contributor to soil science. Soil scientists include agrologists, pedologists and soil classifiers.

The following is a list of notable soil scientists.

Lists of natural scientists
 
Soil science-related lists